Copper Hills High School is located in West Jordan, Utah, United States, situated just east of the Oquirrh Mountains in the southwest corner of the Salt Lake Valley near the Bingham Canyon Copper Mine. It is part of the Jordan School District. The school opened in fall 1995 and has an enrollment of 2,761.

Academics

Copper Hills offers concurrent enrollment classes at the school via Salt Lake Community College. Students attend the college-level classes at Copper Hills for either a quarter, semester, or full year (depending on the class). Credit is received based on overall grade performance and, in most cases, a cumulative exam of the information learned in the class. Additionally, Copper Hills offers nationwide Advanced Placement (AP) classes to its students.

Copper Hills offers clubs and extracurricular activities including American Sign Language, Future Farmers of America, Cheerleading, Dance, Debate, DECA/FBLA, Drama, D&D Club, French Club, Chasms literary magazine, Yearbook, FCCLA, Social Ballroom Dance, TV Broadcasting, Student Government, Band, National Honors Society, Newspaper, Skills USA/VICA, Spanish language Club, Technology Student Association, and Science Club.

Starting in the 2006–2007 school year, the school required students to take "Partner Adults With Students" (PAWS). PAWS was a mandatory 30-minute class taken every Wednesday where students discussed concerns an issues with their teachers, who would provide further instruction on a provided topic.

Starting in the 2007–2008 school year, Copper Hills included five academies within the school: Business and Information Technology, Performing Arts/Crafts, Industry/Mathematics and Science, English/Social Studies, and Athletics. All students were required to choose an academy. The school grouped students of the same academy to take classes geared toward that particular academy. The high school no longer has these academies.

Test scores

American College Test (ACT)

Advanced Placement Test (AP)

Orchestra program
The orchestra is led and conducted by Jenna Baumgart. It has achieved many state titles since 2002.

In the 2006–2007 school year, the Chamber Orchestra attended a tour of San Diego, California, playing Handel's Concerto Grosso 1 as well as Paul Hindemith's Acht Stuke. They achieved superior ratings at the Utah State level competition for orchestras held at Brigham.

Student Government
The Student Government of Copper Hills High is currently advised by Scott Adamson and Angela Beatty.

The officer corps is made up of ten Student Body Officers and sixteen Class Officers, elected during April of each year.

Broadcasting/Video Production Program 
The broadcasting and video production program is currently led and taught by Kamiko Adcock and is known as "CH Studios." The broadcasting team won Best Live Event at the 2020-2021 Broadcast Awards for their CHHS Madrigals livestream. The film program also won a The Utah High School Film Festival 2021-2022 48 Hour Film Festival for their short film “Parasocial.” The program continues to create high quality video productions on their youtube channel "CH Studios."

Choir program
The Concert Choir and Madrigal choirs are led and conducted by Marc Taylor, and have attained many region, state, and national titles.

The choral department is one of the largest in the school. It includes the Concert Choir (made up of more than 90 students), Madrigal Choir (made up of 20 to 28 students), Mixed Choir (made up of more than 60 students), Men's Choir and Ladies' Choir.

Donation center
In 2016, the school made both local and national headlines for a donation center founded by teacher Rickee Stewart and based in the school. Stewart began the donation center after asking for donations for homeless and impoverished students in the area instead of gifts for her upcoming wedding. Since then, the donation center has been featured in various media outlets such as NBC Nightly News, People, and the Ellen DeGeneres Show. In 2017, Stewart made an appearance on Rachael Ray in which Ray, in association with Burlington Coat Factory, donated 1,000 winter coats for those who unable to afford one, and $10,000 to the school.

Athletics

Region championships
 1998, boys' basketball
 2002, baseball
 2005, girls' cross country
 2006, girls' cross country
 2008, girls' golf
 2009, boys' soccer
 2010, boys' soccer
 2011, boys' soccer
 2012, softball
 2012, girls' track
 2012, drill team
 2013, drill team
 2013, girls track
 2014, drill team
 2015, drill team
 2015, wrestling
 2015, boys' track
 2015, softball
 2016, drill team
 2016, debate
 2016, boys basketball
 2017, boys basketball
 2017, debate
 2017, drill team
 2018, boys basketball
 2018, girls' volleyball
 2018, girls' soccer
 2018, debate
 2018, drill team
 2019, boys' soccer
 2019, boys basketball
State championships
 2000, boys' basketball (5A)
 2013, drill team
 2013, softball
 2013, color guard, AA division
 2014, drill team
 2014, color guard, Scholastic Regional A division
 2015, drill team
 2016, drill team
 2016, racquetball
 2017, drill team
 2017, debate
 2018, drill team
 2018, Cheer, (Fight Song)
 2018 Hockey
 2018, debate
 2019, debate
 2018, drill team

National championships
 2010, drill team, 2nd at Nationals
 2011, drill team, 1st at Nationals

Dance controversy 
In 2004, the school adopted a "policy requiring same-sex couples to get parental permission before attending school dances." This prompted a complaint from the ACLU on December 7, 2004. Two weeks later, the school revoked the policy.

Drill team controversy  
In 2016, after winning the Utah State Drill Team 5A Championship, drill team head coach Shannon Mortensen was investigated by the Utah High School Activities Association (UHSAA) for collusion with the judges among other charges.  Coach Mortensen was ultimately placed on probation along with Copper Hills High School as a result of the investigation.

COVID-19 school cancellation 
During the 2019–20 school year, due to the COVID-19 pandemic, it was announced that in-person classes at Copper Hills High School would be canceled starting on March 18, 2020. All after-school and extracurricular activities at the school were canceled as well. During this time, students were provided with a remote learning experience through online services such as Canvas and Google Classroom.

For the 2020–21 school year, new and returning students had the option to enroll in virtual learning as well as the option to return to a classroom setting, while practicing social distancing and wearing protective face coverings whenever possible. Due to an outbreak of COVID-19 in the school, all classes were moved to virtual learning from January 25, 2021, to February 1, 2021. The school district's mask requirement was lifted on June 1, 2021.

For the current 2021–22 school year, classes are now fully in-person, with face coverings optional but highly encouraged.

Allegations of racism 
During the 2020–21 school year, a daycare assistant posted a photo of herself in blackface on Facebook. She was later terminated from the position by the Jordan School District.

Notable alumni
 Sealver Siliga, class of 2008; player in the National Football League
Roni Jones-Perry, class of 2015; player for the United States women's national volleyball team

References

External links

 

Public high schools in Utah
Educational institutions established in 1995
Schools in Salt Lake County, Utah
1995 establishments in Utah
Buildings and structures in West Jordan, Utah